Lawrence Ernest Oscar Duke (December 21, 1880 – January 19, 1954) was a provincial politician from Alberta, Canada. He served as a member of the Legislative Assembly of Alberta from 1935 to 1948, sitting with the Social Credit caucus in government.

References

Alberta Social Credit Party MLAs
1954 deaths
1880 births